Court Street Historic District is a national historic district located at Plattsburgh in Clinton County, New York. The residential district includes 51 contributing buildings. The district generally consists of large scale Queen Anne or Colonial Revival style residences built in the early 20th century, with some examples of mid-19th century Greek Revival and Italianate style residences.

It was added to the National Register of Historic Places in 1982.

References

Houses on the National Register of Historic Places in New York (state)
Historic districts on the National Register of Historic Places in New York (state)
Queen Anne architecture in New York (state)
Colonial Revival architecture in New York (state)
Historic districts in Clinton County, New York
Houses in Clinton County, New York
National Register of Historic Places in Clinton County, New York